Emil Hellman (born 20 April 2001) is a Swedish football defender who plays for Helsingborgs IF.

References

2001 births
Living people
Swedish footballers
Association football defenders
Helsingborgs IF players
Ängelholms FF players
Allsvenskan players
Superettan players
Ettan Fotboll players